The Soviet, later Russian IDA71 military and naval rebreather is an oxygen rebreather intended for use by naval and military divers including Russian commando frogmen. As supplied it is in a plain backpack harness with no buoyancy aid. The casing is pressed aluminium with a hinged cover. It has a small optional nitrox cylinder which can be clipped on its outside to convert it to nitrox mode. It contains one oxygen cylinder and two absorbent canisters. In the bottom of its casing is an empty space which is intended for an underwater communications set.

Here, "up", "back", etc. refer to a man wearing the set standing on land.

The casing is thinner towards the lower end, to reduce drag.

On the front of the harness of the navy frogman version there is a projecting metal plate intended to carry a limpet mine. The front of the harness is a tough rubber "apron".

The loop of each breathing tube can be strapped down to the shoulder to keep it under control to stop it from catching on things or being easily grabbed from behind.

On each side of the casing is a small clip to fasten a parachute to.

Operating modes
The IDA-71 can be used as an oxygen rebreather, or with the addition of an external cylinder, as a nitrox rebreather, which converts between nitrox and oxygen automatically by a pressure activated valve on the nitrox attachment.

It can run as an ordinary diving rebreather. Or it can be run with one of its two absorbent canisters filled with potassium superoxide, which gives off oxygen as it absorbs carbon dioxide: 4KO2 + 2CO2 = 2K2CO3 + 3O2; in this mode the oxygen cylinder is a bailout, or to fill and flush the circuit at the start of the dive. This mode gives the set more duration underwater, but is dangerous and not to be risked by civilians because of the explosively hot reaction that happens if water gets on the potassium superoxide; whereas ordinary modern diver's rebreather absorbents have been designed to avoid producing a caustic solution (commonly called "cocktail") if they get wet. Tests at the United States Navy Experimental Diving Unit in Panama City, Florida showed that the IDA71 could give significantly longer dive time with superoxide in one of the canisters than without.

For many years the IDA71 and similar have been a standard Russian frogman's and naval work diver's breathing set. The "71" in its name may be the year that it was designed, like with the numbers in the names of the AK series of Russian rifles. Other name is Individual Breathing Apparatus (translit. Individualniy Dykhatelniy Apparat).

In its original Russian mode as an oxygen rebreather, its dive duration is said to be 4 hours. Filling both canisters with soda lime and putting a second oxygen cylinder in the empty space at the bottom, might increase its dive duration to 8 hours.

A number of IDA71's have found their way out of the ex-USSR to Europe and America, where recreational divers have added a wing buoyancy compensator and converted them into manually controlled closed circuit rebreathers.

Gallery

References

External links 

http://www.therebreathersite.nl/Zuurstofrebreathers/Russian/ida-71.htm information & links
http://www.therebreathersite.nl/Zuurstofrebreathers/Russian/photos_ida-71.htm pictures & links
https://web.archive.org/web/20120314061648/http://www.smrebreathers.ru/rebreathers/rebreather/time_before_time/boets2.jpg Frogman with IDA71 and APS underwater rifle
Images of Russian frogmen on land
http://sport.freepage.de/rsdas/ Swiss technical Info about IDA71 with pictures
http://www.bleilatschen.de/idamania7.htm German Information, use of the device, field report

IDA71
Military equipment of the Soviet Union